The 1996 Chicago Cubs season was the 125th season of the Chicago Cubs franchise, the 121st in the National League and the 81st at Wrigley Field. The Cubs finished fourth in the National League Central with a record of 76–86.

Offseason
March 9, 1996: Kent Bottenfield was signed as a free agent with the Chicago Cubs.

Regular season

Season standings

Record vs. opponents

Game log

|- bgcolor="ccffcc"
| 1 || April 1 || Padres || 5–4 (10) || Patterson (1–0) || Hoffman || — || 38,734 || 1–0
|- bgcolor="ffbbbb"
| 2 || April 3 || Padres || 5–7 || Hamilton || Castillo (0–1) || Hoffman || 29,638 || 1–1
|- bgcolor="ccffcc"
| 3 || April 4 || Dodgers || 9–4 || Foster (1–0) || Astacio || — || 12,626 || 2–1
|- bgcolor="ccffcc"
| 4 || April 5 || Dodgers || 11–1 || Bullinger (1–0) || Candiotti || — || 19,324 || 3–1
|- bgcolor="ffbbbb"
| 5 || April 6 || Dodgers || 1–3 || Park || Navarro (0–1) || Worrell || 24,428 || 3–2
|- bgcolor="ccffcc"
| 6 || April 7 || Dodgers || 5–4 || Jones (1–0) || Osuna || — || 19,002 || 4–2
|- bgcolor="ccffcc"
| 7 || April 8 || @ Rockies || 9–6 || Adams (1–0) || Ritz || Jones (1) || 50,185 || 5–2
|- bgcolor="ffbbbb"
| 8 || April 10 || @ Rockies || 9–10 || Leskanic || Jones (1–1) || — || 50,083 || 5–3
|- bgcolor="ffbbbb"
| 9 || April 12 || @ Giants || 1–4 || Leiter || Navarro (0–2) || Beck || 45,589 || 5–4
|- bgcolor="ffbbbb"
| 10 || April 13 || @ Giants || 2–3 (10) || Juden || Myers (0–1) || — || 22,120 || 5–5
|- bgcolor="ccffcc"
| 11 || April 14 || @ Giants || 6–2 || Foster (2–0) || Watson || Wendell (1) || 23,137 || 6–5
|- bgcolor="ffbbbb"
| 12 || April 15 || Reds || 2–3 (10) || Moore || Patterson (1–1) || Brantley || 20,395 || 6–6
|- bgcolor="ccffcc"
| 13 || April 16 || Reds || 6–3 || Trachsel (1–0) || Portugal || — || 11,464 || 7–6
|- bgcolor="ccffcc"
| 14 || April 17 || Reds || 8–6 (10) || Wendell (1–0) || Ruffin || — || 13,023 || 8–6
|- bgcolor="ccffcc"
| 15 || April 18 || Giants || 7–6 || Perez (1–0) || VanLandingham || Wendell (2) || 15,857 || 9–6
|- bgcolor="ccffcc"
| 16 || April 19 || Giants || 10–6 || Foster (3–0) || Watson || — || 17,662 || 10–6
|- bgcolor="ffbbbb"
| 17 || April 20 || Giants || 4–8 || Gardner || Bullinger (1–1) || — || 28,047 || 10–7
|- bgcolor="ffbbbb"
| 18 || April 21 || Giants || 6–7 || Fernandez || Trachsel (1–1) || Beck || 28,065 || 10–8
|- bgcolor="ffbbbb"
| 19 || April 22 || Rockies || 2–4 || Freeman || Navarro (0–3) || Leskanic || 21,227 || 10–9
|- bgcolor="ffbbbb"
| 20 || April 23 || Rockies || 3–4 || Rekar || Castillo (0–2) || Leskanic || 14,325 || 10–10
|- bgcolor="ffbbbb"
| 21 || April 24 || @ Padres || 4–5 || Hamilton || Foster (3–1) || Hoffman || 15,608 || 10–11
|- bgcolor="ffbbbb"
| 22 || April 25 || @ Padres || 3–8 || Tewksbury || Bullinger (1–2) || — || 18,736 || 10–12
|- bgcolor="ffbbbb"
| 23 || April 26 || @ Dodgers || 0–1 || Astacio || Trachsel (1–2) || Worrell || 31,172 || 10–13
|- bgcolor="ccffcc"
| 24 || April 27 || @ Dodgers || 4–3 (10) || Navarro (1–3) || Osuna || Jones (2) || 43,519 || 11–13
|- bgcolor="ccffcc"
| 25 || April 28 || @ Dodgers || 3–0 || Castillo (1–2) || Park || — || 45,441 || 12–13
|- bgcolor="ffbbbb"
| 26 || April 29 || @ Dodgers || 4–10 || Valdez || Foster (3–2) || — || 39,003 || 12–14
|- bgcolor="ccffcc"
| 27 || April 30 || Cardinals || 7–6 || Wendell (2–0) || Eckersley || — || 20,771 || 13–14
|-

|- bgcolor="ccffcc"
| 28 || May 1 || Cardinals || 9–3 || Trachsel (2–2) || Benes || — || 25,668 || 14–14
|- bgcolor="ccffcc"
| 29 || May 3 || Mets || 4–2 || Navarro (2–3) || Wilson || — || 19,822 || 15–14
|- bgcolor="ffbbbb"
| 30 || May 4 || Mets || 3–7 || Jones || Castillo (1–3) || Henry || 30,041 || 15–15
|- bgcolor="ccffcc"
| 31 || May 5 || Mets || 5–4 || Wendell (3–0) || Dipoto || — || 25,949 || 16–15
|- bgcolor="ffbbbb"
| 32 || May 6 || @ Expos || 2–6 || Martinez || Bullinger (1–3) || — || 46,893 || 16–16
|- bgcolor="ffbbbb"
| 33 || May 7 || @ Expos || 3–8 || Veres || Adams (1–1) || — || 13,236 || 16–17
|- bgcolor="ffbbbb"
| 34 || May 8 || @ Expos || 2–4 || Cormier || Navarro (2–4) || Rojas || 12,484 || 16–18
|- bgcolor="ffbbbb"
| 35 || May 10 || @ Mets || 0–2 || Jones || Castillo (1–4) || Franco || 16,687 || 16–19
|- bgcolor="ffbbbb"
| 36 || May 11 || @ Mets || 6–7 || Henry || Jones (1–2) || — || 23,237 || 16–20
|- bgcolor="ccffcc"
| 37 || May 12 || @ Mets || 3–0 || Bullinger (2–3) || Clark || — || 19,122 || 17–20
|- bgcolor="ccffcc"
| 38 || May 13 || Astros || 6–0 || Trachsel (3–2) || Reynolds || — || 22,610 || 18–20
|- bgcolor="ffbbbb"
| 39 || May 14 || Astros || 3–6 || Kile || Navarro (2–5) || Jones || 17,562 || 18–21
|- bgcolor="ffbbbb"
| 40 || May 15 || Astros || 5–7 || Wall || Castillo (1–5) || Jones || 16,093 || 18–22
|- bgcolor="ccffcc"
| 41 || May 16 || Astros || 13–1 || Telemaco (1–0) || Drabek || — || 15,902 || 19–22
|- bgcolor="ccffcc"
| 42 || May 17 || Marlins || 3–1 || Bullinger (3–3) || Leiter || Wendell (3) || 32,528 || 20–22
|- bgcolor="ffbbbb"
| 43 || May 18 || Marlins || 2–3 || Burkett || Trachsel (3–3) || Nen || 38,003 || 20–23
|- bgcolor="ffbbbb"
| 44 || May 19 || Marlins || 7–8 (11) || Mantei || Wendell (3–1) || Nen || 30,420 || 20–24
|- bgcolor="ffbbbb"
| 45 || May 20 || @ Braves || 1–18 || Avery || Castillo (1–6) || — || 29,984 || 20–25
|- bgcolor="ccffcc"
| 46 || May 21 || @ Braves || 4–2 || Telemaco (2–0) || Wohlers || Patterson (1) || 31,045 || 21–25
|- bgcolor="ffbbbb"
| 47 || May 22 || @ Braves || 4–9 || Glavine || Bullinger (3–4) || — || 33,186 || 21–26
|- bgcolor="ffbbbb"
| 48 || May 24 || @ Astros || 7–8 (10) || Jones || Patterson (1–2) || — || 23,910 || 21–27
|- bgcolor="ffbbbb"
| 49 || May 25 || @ Astros || 2–5 || Drabek || Navarro (2–6) || Jones || 34,326 || 21–28
|- bgcolor="ffbbbb"
| 50 || May 26 || @ Astros || 2–7 || Reynolds || Castillo (1–7) || — || 33,245 || 21–29
|- bgcolor="ffbbbb"
| 51 || May 27 || Braves || 1–9 || Glavine || Telemaco (2–1) || — || 33,070 || 21–30
|- bgcolor="ffbbbb"
| 52 || May 29 || Braves || 0–2 || Smoltz || Trachsel (3–4) || — || 30,601 || 21–31
|- bgcolor="ccffcc"
| 53 || May 31 || @ Marlins || 2–1 || Navarro (3–6) || Rapp || — || 19,552 || 22–31
|-

|- bgcolor="ccffcc"
| 54 || June 1 || @ Marlins || 5–4 (10) || Wendell (4–1) || Mathews || — || 30,133 || 23–31
|- bgcolor="ffbbbb"
| 55 || June 2 || @ Marlins || 2–3 || Brown || Telemaco (2–2) || Nen || 22,174 || 23–32
|- bgcolor="ccffcc"
| 56 || June 3 || Phillies || 4–3 || Patterson (2–2) || Ryan || — || 26,320 || 24–32
|- bgcolor="ffbbbb"
| 57 || June 4 || Phillies || 3–12 || Williams || Bullinger (3–5) || — || 15,431 || 24–33
|- bgcolor="ccffcc"
| 58 || June 5 || Phillies || 9–6 || Adams (2–1) || Borland || Wendell (4) || 18,189 || 25–33
|- bgcolor="ffbbbb"
| 59 || June 7 || Expos || 3–9 || Fassero || Castillo (1–8) || — || 23,860 || 25–34
|- bgcolor="ccffcc"
| 60 || June 8 || Expos || 6–4 || Telemaco (3–2) || Martinez || Wendell (5) || 37,373 || 26–34
|- bgcolor="ccffcc"
| 61 || June 9 || Expos || 4–2 || Trachsel (4–4) || Rueter || Wendell (6) || 30,785 || 27–34
|- bgcolor="ccffcc"
| 62 || June 10 || @ Phillies || 2–1 || Navarro (4–6) || Mulholland || — || 19,588 || 28–34
|- bgcolor="ccffcc"
| 63 || June 11 || @ Phillies || 9–2 || Campbell (1–0) || Munoz || — || 23,220 || 29–34
|- bgcolor="ffbbbb"
| 64 || June 12 || @ Phillies || 3–4 || Fernandez || Castillo (1–9) || Bottalico || 27,287 || 29–35
|- bgcolor="ccffcc"
| 65 || June 13 || Padres || 6–3 (14) || Jones (2–2) || Blair || — || 28,953 || 30–35
|- bgcolor="ccffcc"
| 66 || June 14 || Padres || 5–1 || Trachsel (5–4) || Tewksbury || — || 30,877 || 31–35
|- bgcolor="ffbbbb"
| 67 || June 15 || Padres || 1–2 || Worrell || Navarro (4–7) || Hoffman || 39,465 || 31–36
|- bgcolor="ccffcc"
| 68 || June 16 || Padres || 8–4 || Castillo (2–9) || Valenzuela || Bullinger (1) || 33,376 || 32–36
|- bgcolor="ffbbbb"
| 69 || June 18 || Dodgers || 6–9 || Martinez || Telemaco (3–3) || Worrell || — || 32–37
|- bgcolor="ccffcc"
| 70 || June 18 || Dodgers || 7–4 || Campbell (2–0) || Valdez || — || 23,362 || 33–37
|- bgcolor="ffbbbb"
| 71 || June 19 || Dodgers || 3–4 (13) || Park || Adams (2–2) || Worrell || 28,477 || 33–38
|- bgcolor="ccffcc"
| 72 || June 20 || @ Padres || 3–2 || Navarro (5–7) || Worrell || Wendell (7) || 19,969 || 34–38
|- bgcolor="ffbbbb"
| 73 || June 21 || @ Padres || 1–2 (10) || Hoffman || Wendell (4–2) || — || 49,503 || 34–39
|- bgcolor="ccffcc"
| 74 || June 22 || @ Padres || 9–6 (16) || Myers (1–1) || Blair || — || 51,917 || 35–39
|- bgcolor="ffbbbb"
| 75 || June 23 || @ Padres || 4–5 || Hamilton || Telemaco (3–4) || Hoffman || 30,672 || 35–40
|- bgcolor="ccffcc"
| 76 || June 25 || @ Dodgers || 2–0 || Trachsel (6–4) || Nomo || — || 37,448 || 36–40
|- bgcolor="ccffcc"
| 77 || June 26 || @ Dodgers || 6–4 || Navarro (6–7) || Candiotti || Adams (1) || 35,200 || 37–40
|- bgcolor="ffbbbb"
| 78 || June 28 || @ Reds || 4–7 || Smiley || Castillo (2–10) || Smith || 27,864 || 37–41
|- bgcolor="ffbbbb"
| 79 || June 29 || @ Reds || 5–9 || Portugal || Bullinger (3–6) || — || 32,273 || 37–42
|- bgcolor="ccffcc"
| 80 || June 30 || @ Reds || 6–0 || Trachsel (7–4) || Burba || — || 30,352 || 38–42
|-

|- bgcolor="ffbbbb"
| 81 || July 1 || @ Pirates || 1–4 || Darwin || Navarro (6–8) || Plesac || 15,910 || 38–43
|- bgcolor="ccffcc"
| 82 || July 2 || @ Pirates || 15–7 || Telemaco (4–4) || Wagner || — || 13,241 || 39–43
|- bgcolor="ffbbbb"
| 83 || July 3 || @ Pirates || 2–3 || Neagle || Castillo (2–11) || Plesac || 22,157 || 39–44
|- bgcolor="ffbbbb"
| 84 || July 4 || Reds || 1–2 || Portugal || Bullinger (3–7) || Brantley || 38,047 || 39–45
|- bgcolor="ffbbbb"
| 85 || July 5 || Reds || 0–3 || Burba || Trachsel (7–5) || Brantley || 40,743 || 39–46
|- bgcolor="ccffcc"
| 86 || July 6 || Reds || 6–2 || Patterson (3–2) || Carrasco || — || 38,690 || 40–46
|- bgcolor="ccffcc"
| 87 || July 7 || Reds || 7–6 (13) || Sturtze (1–0) || Ruffin || — || 36,352 || 41–46
|- bgcolor="ccffcc"
| 88 || July 11 || Cardinals || 6–0 || Navarro (7–8) || Osborne || — || 38,802 || 42–46
|- bgcolor="ffbbbb"
| 89 || July 12 || Cardinals || 3–13 || Benes || Trachsel (7–6) || — || 38,918 || 42–47
|- bgcolor="ffbbbb"
| 90 || July 13 || Cardinals || 5–10 || Stottlemyre || Bullinger (3–8) || Eckersley || 39,254 || 42–48
|- bgcolor="ffbbbb"
| 91 || July 14 || Cardinals || 6–7 || Benes || Adams (2–3) || Eckersley || 38,638 || 42–49
|- bgcolor="ccffcc"
| 92 || July 15 || Pirates || 12–2 || Castillo (3–11) || Miceli || — || 32,119 || 43–49
|- bgcolor="ffbbbb"
| 93 || July 16 || Pirates || 5–10 || Neagle || Navarro (7–9) || — || 26,502 || 43–50
|- bgcolor="ccffcc"
| 94 || July 18 || @ Cardinals || 6–5 || Bottenfield (1–0) || Petkovsek || Wendell (8) || 38,983 || 44–50
|- bgcolor="ffbbbb"
| 95 || July 19 || @ Cardinals || 1–9 || Benes || Castillo (3–12) || — || 45,336 || 44–51
|- bgcolor="ccffcc"
| 96 || July 20 || @ Cardinals || 3–0 || Trachsel (8–6) || Morgan || Wendell (9) || 50,418 || 45–51
|- bgcolor="ffbbbb"
| 97 || July 21 || @ Cardinals || 5–6 (10) || Petkovsek || Wendell (4–3) || — || 42,257 || 45–52
|- bgcolor="ffbbbb"
| 98 || July 22 || @ Giants || 2–3 || Bautista || Bottenfield (1–1) || — || 12,902 || 45–53
|- bgcolor="ccffcc"
| 99 || July 23 || @ Giants || 9–6 || Myers (2–1) || DeLucia || Patterson (2) || 15,878 || 46–53
|- bgcolor="ccffcc"
| 100 || July 24 || @ Giants || 7–1 || Castillo (4–12) || VanLandingham || — || 13,695 || 47–53
|- bgcolor="ccffcc"
| 101 || July 25 || @ Rockies || 10–8 || Bottenfield (2–1) || Ruffin || Patterson (3) || 48,087 || 48–53
|- bgcolor="ccffcc"
| 102 || July 26 || @ Rockies || 17–4 || Navarro (8–9) || Freeman || Adams (2) || 48,062 || 49–53
|- bgcolor="ffbbbb"
| 103 || July 27 || @ Rockies || 6–10 || Thompson || Telemaco (4–5) || — || 48,096 || 49–54
|- bgcolor="ccffcc"
| 104 || July 28 || @ Rockies || 7–5 || Bullinger (4–8) || Ritz || Bottenfield (1) || 48,073 || 50–54
|- bgcolor="ccffcc"
| 105 || July 30 || Giants || 4–0 || Castillo (5–12) || VanLandingham || Adams (3) || 37,424 || 51–54
|- bgcolor="ccffcc"
| 106 || July 31 || Giants || 4–1 || Trachsel (9–6) || Watson || Wendell (10) || 28,988 || 52–54
|-

|- bgcolor="ccffcc"
| 107 || August 1 || Rockies || 4–1 || Navarro (9–9) || Thompson || Patterson (4) || 25,564 || 53–54
|- bgcolor="ffbbbb"
| 108 || August 2 || Rockies || 2–7 || Ritz || Telemaco (4–6) || — || 34,186 || 53–55
|- bgcolor="ffbbbb"
| 109 || August 3 || Rockies || 2–8 || Wright || Bullinger (4–9) || — || 40,460 || 53–56
|- bgcolor="ffbbbb"
| 110 || August 4 || Rockies || 1–6 || Reynoso || Castillo (5–13) || — || 38,738 || 53–57
|- bgcolor="ccffcc"
| 111 || August 5 || Mets || 7–3 || Trachsel (10–6) || Wilson || — || 36,766 || 54–57
|- bgcolor="ccffcc"
| 112 || August 6 || Mets || 3–0 || Navarro (10–9) || Clark || Patterson (5) || 24,558 || 55–57
|- bgcolor="ffbbbb"
| 113 || August 7 || Mets || 7–11 || Dipoto || Adams (2–4) || — || 27,086 || 55–58
|- bgcolor="ccffcc"
| 114 || August 9 || @ Expos || 11–9 || Bullinger (5–9) || Cormier || Patterson (6) || 15,498 || 56–58
|- bgcolor="ccffcc"
| 115 || August 10 || @ Expos || 3–2 || Casian (1–0) || Dyer || Wendell (11) || 16,724 || 57–58
|- bgcolor="ffbbbb"
| 116 || August 11 || @ Expos || 3–4 (10) || Rojas || Bottenfield (2–2) || — || 20,120 || 57–59
|- bgcolor="ccffcc"
| 117 || August 12 || @ Mets || 11–1 || Navarro (11–9) || Isringhausen || — || 17,636 || 58–59
|- bgcolor="ccffcc"
| 118 || August 13 || @ Mets || 3–2 || Telemaco (5–6) || Harnisch || Wendell (12) || 17,819 || 59–59
|- bgcolor="ffbbbb"
| 119 || August 14 || @ Mets || 5–8 || Jones || Bullinger (5–10) || Franco || 20,110 || 59–60
|- bgcolor="ffbbbb"
| 120 || August 16 || Astros || 3–8 || Hampton || Castillo (5–14) || — || 37,139 || 59–61
|- bgcolor="ccffcc"
| 121 || August 17 || Astros || 12–3 || Trachsel (11–6) || Kile || — || 39,775 || 60–61
|- bgcolor="ccffcc"
| 122 || August 18 || Astros || 10–8 || Navarro (12–9) || Brocail || Wendell (13) || 37,210 || 61–61
|- bgcolor="ffbbbb"
| 123 || August 19 || Marlins || 3–4 || Brown || Telemaco (5–7) || Nen || 32,302 || 61–62
|- bgcolor="ccffcc"
| 124 || August 20 || Marlins || 8–1 || Foster (4–2) || Hutton || — || 22,119 || 62–62
|- bgcolor="ccffcc"
| 125 || August 21 || Marlins || 8–3 || Castillo (6–14) || Rapp || — || 27,699 || 63–62
|- bgcolor="ffbbbb"
| 126 || August 23 || @ Braves || 3–4 || Maddux || Trachsel (11–7) || Wohlers || 38,210 || 63–63
|- bgcolor="ffbbbb"
| 127 || August 24 || @ Braves || 5–6 || Clontz || Casian (1–1) || — || 46,804 || 63–64
|- bgcolor="ccffcc"
| 128 || August 25 || @ Braves || 3–2 || Foster (5–2) || Wohlers || Wendell (14) || 35,176 || 64–64
|- bgcolor="ffbbbb"
| 129 || August 27 || @ Astros || 5–6 || Morman || Adams (2–5) || Hernandez || 15,374 || 64–65
|- bgcolor="ffbbbb"
| 130 || August 28 || @ Astros || 4–5 || Olson || Bottenfield (2–3) || — || 18,026 || 64–66
|- bgcolor="ccffcc"
| 131 || August 29 || @ Astros || 4–3 || Navarro (13–9) || Reynolds || Wendell (15) || 16,151 || 65–66
|- bgcolor="ccffcc"
| 132 || August 30 || Braves || 3–2 || Foster (6–2) || Glavine || Patterson (7) || — || 66–66
|- bgcolor="ffbbbb"
| 133 || August 30 || Braves || 5–6 || Borowski || Bottenfield (2–4) || Wohlers || 31,548 || 66–67
|- bgcolor="ccffcc"
| 134 || August 31 || Braves || 12–0 || Castillo (7–14) || Neagle || Adams (4) || 38,691 || 67–67
|-

|- bgcolor="ccffcc"
| 135 || September 1 || Braves || 2–1 (12) || Campbell (3–0) || Borowski || — || 40,192 || 68–67
|- bgcolor="ffbbbb"
| 136 || September 2 || @ Marlins || 3–4 || Valdes || Trachsel (11–8) || Nen || 16,622 || 68–68
|- bgcolor="ccffcc"
| 137 || September 3 || @ Marlins || 11–3 || Navarro (14–9) || Leiter || — || 15,528 || 69–68
|- bgcolor="ffbbbb"
| 138 || September 4 || @ Marlins || 2–9 || Brown || Foster (6–3) || — || 14,879 || 69–69
|- bgcolor="ffbbbb"
| 139 || September 5 || @ Phillies || 1–6 || Schilling || Castillo (7–15) || — || 18,164 || 69–70
|- bgcolor="ccffcc"
| 140 || September 6 || @ Phillies || 6–4 || Bullinger (6–10) || Ryan || Wendell (16) || 17,803 || 70–70
|- bgcolor="ffbbbb"
| 141 || September 7 || @ Phillies || 2–4 || Hunter || Bottenfield (2–5) || Bottalico || 18,021 || 70–71
|- bgcolor="ccffcc"
| 142 || September 8 || @ Phillies || 5–3 || Navarro (15–9) || Mimbs || Wendell (17) || 27,600 || 71–71
|- bgcolor="ccffcc"
| 143 || September 9 || Expos || 3–1 || Foster (7–3) || Paniagua || — || 24,452 || 72–71
|- bgcolor="ccffcc"
| 144 || September 10 || Expos || 10–3 || Bottenfield (3–5) || Daal || — || 26,700 || 73–71
|- bgcolor="ffbbbb"
| 145 || September 11 || Expos || 1–2 || Urbina || Adams (2–6) || Rojas || 30,729 || 73–72
|- bgcolor="ccffcc"
| 146 || September 13 || Phillies || 4–2 || Trachsel (12–8) || Hunter || Wendell (18) || 23,048 || 74–72
|- bgcolor="ffbbbb"
| 147 || September 14 || Phillies || 2–6 || Mimbs || Navarro (15–10) || Ryan || 36,290 || 74–73
|- bgcolor="ffbbbb"
| 148 || September 15 || Phillies || 1–6 || Schilling || Foster (7–4) || — || 24,697 || 74–74
|- bgcolor="ffbbbb"
| 149 || September 17 || @ Cardinals || 3–5 || Osborne || Patterson (3–3) || Mathews || 29,612 || 74–75
|- bgcolor="ffbbbb"
| 150 || September 18 || @ Cardinals || 3–5 || Stottlemyre || Trachsel (12–9) || Eckersley || 32,843 || 74–76
|- bgcolor="ffbbbb"
| 151 || September 19 || @ Cardinals || 4–5 (13) || Bailey || Campbell (3–1) || — || 34,923 || 74–77
|- bgcolor="ffbbbb"
| 152 || September 20 || @ Pirates || 4–6 || Lieber || Foster (7–5) || Ericks || 19,285 || 74–78
|- bgcolor="ffbbbb"
| 153 || September 21 || @ Pirates || 3–8 || Loiselle || Swartzbaugh (0–1) || — || 23,619 || 74–79
|- bgcolor="ffbbbb"
| 154 || September 22 || @ Pirates || 3–11 (8) || Cordova || Castillo (7–16) || — || 27,472 || 74–80
|- bgcolor="ccffcc"
| 155 || September 23 || @ Pirates || 4–3 || Trachsel (13–9) || Schmidt || Patterson (8) || 7,684 || 75–80
|- bgcolor="ffbbbb"
| 156 || September 24 || @ Reds || 3–6 || Lyons || Navarro (15–11) || Brantley || 18,584 || 75–81
|- bgcolor="ffbbbb"
| 157 || September 25 || @ Reds || 3–4 || Burba || Foster (7–6) || Brantley || 18,506 || 75–82
|- bgcolor="ffbbbb"
| 158 || September 26 || @ Reds || 4–12 || Jarvis || Swartzbaugh (0–2) || — || 20,777 || 75–83
|- bgcolor="ffbbbb"
| 159 || September 27 || Pirates || 4–7 (10) || Plesac || Wendell (4–4) || — || — || 75–84
|- bgcolor="ccffcc"
| 160 || September 27 || Pirates || 10–9 || Adams (3–6) || Boever || — || 18,757 || 76–84
|- bgcolor="ffbbbb"
| 161 || September 28 || Pirates || 7–8 (10) || Plesac || Wendell (4–5) || — || 29,729 || 76–85
|- bgcolor="ffbbbb"
| 162 || September 29 || Pirates || 3–8 || Loaiza || Navarro (15–12) || — || 26,873 || 76–86
|-

|-
| Legend:       = Win       = LossBold = Cubs team member

Detailed records

Notable transactions
 May 29, 1996: Félix Fermín signed as a free agent with the Chicago Cubs.

Roster

Player stats

Batting

Starters by position
Note: Pos = Position; G = Games played; AB = At bats; H = Hits; Avg. = Batting average; HR = Home runs; RBI = Runs batted in

Other batters
Note: G = Games played; AB = At bats; H = Hits; Avg. = Batting average; HR = Home runs; RBI = Runs batted in

Pitching

Starting pitchers
Note: G = Games pitched; IP = Innings pitched; W = Wins; L = Losses; ERA = Earned run average; SO = Strikeouts

Other pitchers
Note: G = Games pitched; IP = Innings pitched; W = Wins; L = Losses; ERA = Earned run average; SO = Strikeouts

Relief pitchers
Note: G = Games pitched; W = Wins; L = Losses; SV = Saves; ERA = Earned run average; SO = Strikeouts

Farm system

References

1996 Chicago Cubs season at Baseball Reference

Chicago Cubs seasons
Chicago Cubs season
Cub